The Four Freshmen and Five Guitars is an album by The Four Freshmen, released in 1959.

Track listing 
 "Rain" (Eugene Ford, Carey Morgan, Arthur Swanstrom) – 2:24
 "The More I See You" (Harry Warren, Mack Gordon) – 3:09
 "This October" (Bobby Troup) – 2:12
 "Don't Worry 'bout Me" (Rube Bloom, Ted Koehler) – 2:54
 "It's a Pity to Say Goodnight" (Billy Reid, Mack Gordon) – 2:08
 "Oh Lonely Winter" (Bill Comstock, Kenny Albers) – 2:53
 "It All Depends on You" (Ray Henderson, Buddy DeSylva, Lew Brown) – 1:56
 "Nancy (with the Laughing Face)" (Jimmy Van Heusen, Phil Silvers) – 3:03
 "I Never Knew" (Ted Fio Rito, Gus Kahn) – 1:53
 "Invitation" (Bronislaw Kaper, Paul Francis Webster) – 3:03
 "I Understand" (Mabel Wayne, Kim Gannon) – 3:12
 "Come Rain or Come Shine" (Harold Arlen, Johnny Mercer) – 2:22

Personnel 
 Don Barbour - vocals
 Ross Barbour - vocals
 Bob Flanigan - vocals
 Ken Albers - vocals
 Jack Marshall - arranger 
 Al Hendrickson - guitar
 Howard Roberts - guitar
 Bobby Gibbons - guitar
 Tommy Tedesco - guitar
 Bill Pitman - guitar
 George Van Eps - guitar
 Al Viola - guitar
 Herb Ellis - guitar
 Barney Kessel - guitar
 Larry Bunker - vibes
 Red Mitchell - bass
 Shelly Manne - drums
 Jack Sperling - drums

Recorded:  June 17, 1959, Los Angeles.

References

1959 albums
The Four Freshmen albums
Capitol Records albums